The 2022 Cheltenham Gold Cup (known as the Boodles Gold Cup for sponsorship reasons) was the 94th annual running of the Cheltenham Gold Cup horse race and was held at Cheltenham Racecourse, Gloucestershire, England, on 18 March 2022.

The race was won by the 3-1 favourite A Plus Tard, owned by the Cheveley Park Stud, trained in Ireland by Henry de Bromhead and ridden by Rachael Blackmore. Blackmore became the first female jockey to ride the winner of the Cheltenham Gold Cup. The 2021 winner, Minella Indo, was second, and Protektorat finished third.

Result
Source - 

* The distances between the horses are shown in lengths or shorter. s.h. = short-head. nk = neck. † Trainers are based in Great Britain unless indicated. PU = pulled-up

References

External links

Cheltenham Gold Cup
 2022
Cheltenham Gold Cup
2020s in Gloucestershire
Cheltenham Gold Cup